Theodor Leopold Weller (29 May 1802 in Mannheim - 10 December 1880 in Mannheim) was a German genre painter and a major representative of the Munich School.

Life
He was the second son of a Chancery Councillor, who originally wanted him to pursue a legal career, but he displayed an early aptitude for painting.

In 1818, he began his studies at the Academy of Fine Arts, Munich, under Johann Peter von Langer, the first Director. While there, he met Peter von Cornelius, who Crown Prince Ludwig von Bayern had brought there to work on the Glyptothek. However, Weller decided that he was more interested in daily life and nature than grand panoramas. For his detailed and meticulous painting technique, he took Peter von Hess as a model. He travelled to Rome in 1825 with his friend, the landscape painter Ernst Fries and was admitted to the Accademia di San Luca. While there, he hiked throughout Italy, as far as Naples.

In 1833, he returned to Mannheim. In 1836, he married the daughter of a businessman of Italian origin and moved to Munich. In that capacity, prepared a catalog of his own works, which lists 124 items. He died of a stroke.

References

Further reading
 
 Weller, Theodor Leopold. In: Friedrich von Boetticher: Malerwerke des neunzehnten Jahrhunderts. Beitrag zur Kunstgeschichte. Dresden 1898, Band 2. S. 992 ff.

External links 

 ArtNet: More works by Weller

1802 births
1880 deaths
German male painters
Genre painters
19th-century German painters
19th-century German male artists